was a Japanese based video game company founded in March 1991.

Company history
Aspect has developed for the Master System, Game Gear, Pico, Genesis, Saturn, Super NES, Game Boy Advance, Nintendo DS, and WonderSwan Color. Aspect has also worked with the following companies; Sega, Takara Tomy, D3 Publisher, Square, Tec Toy, Banpresto, Takara, Disney Interactive Studios, and even Samsung.

Its initial headquarters were in Higashi-ikebukuro in Toshima, Tokyo. In February 1993, because it had to have more space due to an increase in its operations, it moved to the Tamura Building in Higashi-ikebukuro. For the same reason it moved to Ikebukuro Hara Building, also in Higashi-ikebukuro, in February 1995. It moved to the Ikebukuro East Building, also in Higashi-ikebukuro, in May 2005.

Games

References

External links
Official website (archived, Japanese)
Ancient Co. on MobyGames
Investigating topic on SMS Power!

Defunct video game companies of Japan
Video game companies established in 1991
Video game companies disestablished in 2018
Video game development companies
Japanese companies established in 1991
Japanese companies disestablished in 2018